Aaron Tyrese Cole (born February 28, 1999) is an American Christian hip hop recording artist and songwriter. He began his career at the age of four. He signed to Gotee Records, a record label founded by Christian hip hop performer Toby McKeehan. Cole is known the best for his songs "Right on Time" and "One More Day".

Early and personal life
Cole was raised in a musical family, where his father had his own recording studio in their apartment. Around the time of his high school years, Cole discovered that music is his true vocation, and he wants to serve it as a professional rapper. "I remember in junior high just enjoying being a regular kid, but I would get picked on because I wasn't smoking, drinking, or getting in trouble," says Cole. "One afternoon I came home and told my dad what was going on and why, and he shared that he thought I was called for a purpose and that this calling would cost me to not be like everyone else. It was that moment that I encountered God for the first time for myself, and I knew I was born to do this and began writing and putting my own songs together." Cole currently resides in Bristol, VA.

Music career
Cole began his career at the age of four. One day, his father wrote him a song called "Jesus is the Rock". It was also the title of his first CD, released in July 2003. Throughout his career he bridged the gap between rapping and singing. He has since released a total of six independent projects. He has featured on songs by Hollyn and DJ Maj. In 2016, Cole was inducted into Christian Hip Hop's top media outlet Rapzilla's Freshman Class and noted by Essence Magazine as one of 16 gospel artists to watch. Cole signed to Gotee Records in 2017.

Discography

Albums 
 Jesus Is the Rock (2003)
4th Period (2012)
 Not By Chance (2019)
 Two Up Two Down (2021)

EPs 
 Fifteen Is the New XV (2014)
 If I Can Be Honest (2016)
 Virginia Boy (2018)
 The Other Side (2018)
 AOTY (2020)
 Only U Forever (2020)
 4 (2020)

Singles

Other charted songs

Awards

GMA Dove Awards 

|-
| 2019
| Aaron Cole
| New Artist of the Year
| 
|-
| 2020
| Not By Chance
| Rap/Hip Hop Album of the Year
| 
|-
| rowspan="2" | 2022
| "Above Me" 
| Rap/Hip Hop Recorded Song of the Year
| 
|-
| Two Up Two Down
| Rap/Hip Hop Album of the Year
| 
|}

References

External links
 

1999 births
Living people
American performers of Christian hip hop music
Musicians from Nashville, Tennessee
Songwriters from Tennessee